Democratic Consent–Republican Party (ID–PR) was a political party in San Marino.

History
The party contested national elections for the first time in 1983, when it received 2% of the vote, winning one of the 60 seats in the Grand and General Council. However, it did not contest any further elections.

References

Defunct political parties in San Marino